Büyükada Nature Park is a nature park in Istanbul Province, Turkey.

Büyükada (literally: Big Island) is the biggest of the Princes' Islands, a group of nine islands in the Sea of Marmara, in Adalar district southeast of Istanbul Province. An area east of the island was declared a nature park by the Ministry of Environment and Forest in 2011.

See also
Dilburnu Nature Park, on the western part of Büyükada
Değirmenburnu Nature Park, on the neighboring island Heybeliada

References

Nature parks in Turkey
Protected areas established in 2011
2011 establishments in Turkey
Parks in Istanbul
Adalar